Brauner is a Swedish noble family, with eldest primogenitor the vicar Nicolaus Brodderi Braun (1617-1692) in Madesjö, Nybro, Diocese of Växjö.

The County Governor :sv:Johan Brauner (1668-1743) was ennobled (n:o 1490) in 1715 by King Charles XII of Sweden; elevated to Freiherr in 1731 by King Frederick I of Sweden.

Bibliography 
 Gabriel Anrep, Svenska adelns Ättar-taflor

Swedish noble families
Barons of Sweden